Alex Orban (August 25, 1939 – December 2, 2021) was a Hungarian-American sabre fencer. He competed at the 1968, 1972 and 1976 Summer Olympics. Orban also qualified for the 1980 Olympic team but did not compete due to the U.S. Olympic Committee's boycott of the 1980 Summer Olympics in Moscow, Russia, USSR. He was one of 461 athletes to receive a Congressional Gold Medal many years later.

See also
 List of USFA Division I National Champions

References

External links
 

1939 births
2021 deaths
American male sabre fencers
Olympic fencers of the United States
Fencers at the 1968 Summer Olympics
Fencers at the 1972 Summer Olympics
Fencers at the 1976 Summer Olympics
Hungarian emigrants to the United States
Sportspeople from Budapest
Pan American Games medalists in fencing
Pan American Games gold medalists for the United States
Pan American Games silver medalists for the United States
Congressional Gold Medal recipients
Fencers at the 1971 Pan American Games
Fencers at the 1975 Pan American Games